Dheklapara Tea Garden is a village in the Madarihat Birpara CD block in the Alipurduar subdivision of the Alipurduar district  in the state of West Bengal, India.

Geography

Location

Area overview
Alipurduar district is covered by two maps. It is an extensive area in the eastern end of the Dooars in West Bengal. It is undulating country, largely forested, with numerous rivers flowing down from the outer ranges of the Himalayas in Bhutan. It is a predominantly rural area with 79.38% of the population living in the rural areas. The district has 1 municipal town and 20 census towns and that means that 20.62% of the population lives in urban areas. The scheduled castes and scheduled tribes, taken together, form more than half the population in all the six community development blocks in the district. There is a high concentration of tribal people (scheduled tribes) in the three northern blocks of the district.

Demographics
As per the 2011 Census of India, Dheklapara Tea Garden had a total population of 2,641.  There were 1,321 (50%) males and 1,322 (50%) females. There were 366 persons in the age range of 0 to 6 years. The total number of literate people in Dheklapara Tea Garden was 1,349 (59.24% of the population over 6 years).

Economy
Dheklapara Tea Estate, with 656 workers, was shut down in 2002.
One report puts it succinctly, “The tea estate closed down in 2002 after the owner quit the business. But the workers, some 600 men and women, almost all of them Adivasis, did not leave. They clung on in the hope of a revival. Organising themselves into committees, they started plucking leaves to sell to outside buyers. But the economics of tea do not support direct sales. At best, what the workers sell is good enough to fetch them Rs 35 a day, a third of the regular wage.”

Subsequently, the state government has been providing a monthly assistance of Rs.1,500 to each permanent worker of the locked out gardens. There are about 10,000 jobless workers and their families in nine closed tea gardens in the dooars. Everybody is assured of two plain meals in a day.

References

Villages in Alipurduar district